Church, Paxson & Co. was a New York City-based music publishing company founded in 1909 by Clarence Clinton Church (1880–1972) and Clement Esmond Paxson (1878–1962).  In 1919, the company reorganized as C.C. Church & Co. and moved its headquarters to Hartford, but maintained its New York office at 1367 Broadway.

References 

Sheet music publishing companies
Music publishing companies of the United States
Publishing companies established in 1909